Jose Kurian is an Indian actor in Malayalam movies. He was a romantic hero in early eighties. He has acted in about 95+ films.

Background
Jose Kurian was born in Kochi. He made his debut through Dweepu in 1977. His role in Meen and song "Ullasapoothirikal" alongside Ambika was well noted. He left movie industry late 1980s. He came back to the industry with a 2014 Malayalam movie named Salalah Mobiles.

Personal life

He is married to Susan Jose. His daughter Pranathi was a former actress. He had his high school and college education from St. Albert's High School and St. Albert's College, Ernakulam respectively.

Filmography

Television

References

http://cinidiary.com/peopleinfo.php?pigsection=Actor&picata=1&no_of_displayed_rows=4&no_of_rows_page=10&sletter=J
http://keralaboxoffice.com/tag/malayalam-film-actor-jose-new-movie
http://www.malayalachalachithram.com/movieslist.php?a=586

External links

Jose at MSI

Indian male film actors
Male actors from Kochi
Male actors in Malayalam cinema
Living people
Year of birth missing (living people)
20th-century Indian male actors
21st-century Indian male actors
Indian male television actors
Male actors in Malayalam television